Russia–Palestine relations is the bilateral relationship between the Russian Federation and the State of Palestine.

The history of Palestine–Russia (and before 1991, Palestine–Soviet Union) relations has been long and complex. For a number of historical and political reasons, it has been deeply interwoven with Russian (and before 1991, Soviet) relations
with the Israeli enterprise, Palestinian nationalism, and Third World national liberation movements in general. However, at the same time, particularly between 1956 and 1990, Soviet-Palestinian relations were also part and parcel of the then ongoing Soviet-American confrontation. This relationship has continued even today. Russia remains an important player in the Middle East peace process and is a member of the Middle East Quartet.

History
The emir of Palestine, Zahir al-Umar, jointly invaded the emirate of Lebanon with the Russians in the 1770s. Beirut was occupied more than once before the Ottomans re-established control.

After the Russian Revolution of 1917 which put Vladimir Lenin and the Communist Party of the Soviet Union in power, the Soviet Union was established as a socialist state. In 1922 the Soviet government decided to give strong support to the Palestinian Arabs. In fact, in 1930, the Executive Committee of the Communist International described Zionism as "the expression of the exploiting, and great power oppressive strivings, of the Jewish bourgeoisie." Also, the Communist Party of Palestine, founded by Jewish immigrants in 1919, upon admission to the Comintern, was strongly advised to "support the national freedom of the Arab population against the British-Zionist occupation." But even so the Communist Party of Palestine had little political power. Furthermore, the Soviet Union under Joseph Stalin was mostly concerned with its own problems during the 1920s and 1930s that it had little impact in the Middle East policy.

However, when World War II concluded, the Soviet Union emerged as one of the victors and as a result it became a superpower. This made it able to project its power into regions where it thought it was never possible before. Nevertheless, the USSR voted for the United Nations Partition Plan for Palestine in 1947; the Soviet Union was the first state to recognize the Israeli state de jure three days after the Declaration of Independence on May 17, 1948. This was despite the Soviet Union’s, along with most Middle Eastern Communist parties, denunciation of the partition of Palestine. It seems as if the Soviet policymakers were very pragmatic about the Middle East. Without ever changing its official anti-Zionist stance, from late 1944, until 1948 and even later, Joseph Stalin adopted a pro-Zionist foreign policy, apparently believing that the new country would be socialist (the country was indeed led by a left-wing government its first 30 years) and would speed the decline of British influence in the Middle East. With Israel eventually turning into a pro-Western and American ally however, this caused a great shift. Soon the Soviet government began to put their official anti-Zionism position into practice, supporting the Arabs more than ever. (For example, the 1955 Egyptian-Czechoslovak Arms Deal.) The official position of the Soviet Union and its satellite states and agencies was that Zionism was a tool used by the Jews and Americans for "racist imperialism." The Communist Party of the Soviet Union defined Zionism as "militant chauvinism, racism, anti-Communism and anti-Sovietism ... overt and covert fight against freedom movements and the USSR."

The Soviet government was very cautious about the Palestine Liberation Organization (PLO) (founded in 1964) and the Fatah party (founded in 1958) during the 1960s. The Soviet government was very unhappy about the first two PLO leaders. Nevertheless, the Soviet Union established some contact with the PLO leadership in 1964; in 1965 they established contacts with the General Union of Palestinian Students and the General Union of Palestinian Women. But it was only after the Six-Day War which ended with the defeat of the Arabs by Israel in June 1967 that the Soviet Union took a more favorable view on the PLO. When Yasser Arafat visited Moscow in 1968, Moscow began to see him as their man, and the following year Arafat was elected as chairman of the PLO. Relations with the Palestinians were this firmly established.

By the 1970s, with the loss of Soviet influence in Egypt, relations with the Palestinian militants were strengthened further and soon Soviet arms and training were sent to Palestinian groups. The KGB was responsible for arming and training most of the Palestinian groups. In fact, it was the KGB which decided which militant groups should receive the money and weapons. By 1972 the Soviets had declared the Palestinian movement the vanguard of the Arab liberation movement. In the summer of 1974 a PLO embassy was opened in Moscow. During this time Yasser Arafat had addressed the United Nations and soon the PLO was granted observer status at the UN in 1974. In 1975, the Soviet Union sponsored and voted in support of the UN General Assembly Resolution 3379 which equated Zionism with racism. Ironically the Soviet Union would also sponsor and vote for Resolution 4686 in 1991, which reversed the aforementioned resolution of 1975. After the Camp David Accords in September 1978, the Soviet General Secretary, Leonid Brezhnev, declared that "there is only one road" to a real settlement, "the road of full liberation of all Arab lands occupied by Israel in 1967, of full and unambiguous respect for the lawful rights of the Arab people of Palestine, including the right to create their own independent state." At the end of Arafat's visit to Moscow, 29 October to 1 November 1978, the Soviet authorities finally recognized the PLO as the "sole legitimate representative of the Palestinian people." Nevertheless the Soviet Union urged the PLO and Yasser Arafat to accept the provisions of resolution 242 and recognize Israel and start peace talks (they had and continued to refuse to do so).

In March 1985, Mikhail Gorbachev assumed power and he started his programs of Glasnost and Perestroika which resulted in many changes. The Soviet Union began to reduce support for Third World and other leftist guerrilla movements and urged them to embrace reconciliation. The Soviet Government also encouraged (albeit unsuccessfully) Yasser Arafat and the PLO to recognize Israel before the Palestinian Declaration of Independence on November 15, 1988 in Algiers, Algeria. Despite Soviet condemnations of it (along with the U.S.), the Soviet Union became one of the first countries to recognize the new State of Palestine on 18 November 1988 and officially established full diplomatic relations with it by the end of 1989. During and after the dissolution of the Soviet Union in the early 1990s, the Soviet Union (now Russia) began to increase its relations with Israel, which had been cut off in the aftermath of the Six Day War.

During the Gulf War in early 1991, many elements of the PLO along with Arafat had supported Iraq. The diplomat isolation resulting from this caused the Soviet Union to scale back support for the PLO. The Soviet Union itself was disbanded in December 1991, a few months after the August Coup that same year. As a result the Palestinian Liberation Organization lost one of its main sponsors. The PLO had also been very sympathetic to the coup plotters, greatly angering Gorbachev and the Soviet leaders. This caused the Soviet government to give up support for the PLO. As a result the PLO began peace talks with Israel in 1991. These events, coupled with the growing Islamist trend in Palestinian society and militancy weakened the pro-Russian Palestinian militant groups, most of whom had taken on a hard Marxist–Leninist line.

Current relations

After the fall of the Soviet Union, the newly created Russian Federation continued the policy of supporting the Palestinian cause albeit in a somewhat limited fashion. Under Presidents Boris Yeltsin, Vladimir Putin and Dmitry Medvedev and the United Russia party leadership, Russia has been viewed as balanced and moderate in its dealings with both Israel and the Palestinians, favors peace between both sides. Russia supported the Middle East Peace Process and the Oslo agreements in 1993. Yasser Arafat was a frequent visitor to Moscow during the 1990s until 2001. However, relations also faced obstacles, due to Palestinian involvement in the First and Second Chechen Wars under the Arab Mujahideen in Chechnya.

Russia was one of the countries that voted in 1998 to give Palestine more rights at the UN despite opposition by both Israel and the United States. With his accession after Arafat’s death in 2004, successor Mahmoud Abbas has cultivated stronger connections to Russia. Underscoring these connections, Abbas had earned his degree at the Patrice Lumumba University in Moscow where he had earned his Candidate of Sciences degree (the Soviet equivalent of a PhD). Abbas has continued to visit Russia and has met with Russian leaders in several occasions.

In March 2006, after Hamas’ surprising win in the Palestinian elections earlier that year, Russian-Hamas talks began, as Russian Foreign Minister Sergei Lavrov met with Hamas leader Khaled Meshaal to discuss the future of the Israeli–Palestinian peace process. (Hamas had won a majority of seats in the Palestinian National Authority Legislative Council). Prior to the meeting, in an interview on February 10, 2006, Russian President Vladimir Putin, according to Kommersant journalist Andrey Kolesnikov and a Spanish parliament member, said that he does not consider Hamas a terrorist organization. This is despite Hamas’ charter emphasizing jihad. During the talks in March 2006, Lavrov called on Hamas to comply with the earlier commitments signed by the PLO, and he reiterated those requirements. Hamas promised to respect "the authority and competencies" of Abbas. In an interview in the Austrian daily Kurier, senior Hamas official Aziz Dweik answered on the question if a two-state solution was feasible: "If Israel changes its attitudes toward Palestinians, if it does so much as soften its occupation practice, everything would change. Israel has to do the first step." On March 7, 2006 Russia expressed hope that Hamas would consider supporting the Road map for peace and the peace plan proposed by Saudi Arabia." The invitation and the talks caused controversy regarding Russia changing its views towards the Israeli–Palestinian conflict. This was questioned by commentators in the United States especially among the neoconservatives.

Russia was critical of the Gaza War (2008–09) and condemned Israeli actions. In addition to 60 tons of aid consisting of tents, medicines, and foods, President Medvedev ordered extra humanitarian aid to be sent to the Palestinians. Russia continues to support the creation of a Palestinian State to achieve lasting peace in the Middle East. 

Palestine has separate governments in the Gaza Strip (Hamas) and the West Bank (Fatah) after a brief civil war in 2007. After a meeting between the Foreign Minister of Russia Sergei Lavrov and the Palestinian Foreign Minister Riyad al-Maliki (Fatah) on December 9, 2009, both Russia and Palestine have said that their relations are close and friendly and that Russia will continue to assist Palestine in all fields. On January 26, 2010, Mahmoud Abbas met with Russian President Dmitry Medvedev to discuss the situation in the Middle East. He said that while some progress has been made on peace, it is still not solved yet. President Medvedev said that he hopes to use Russia's influence to solve the Middle East conflict. He also mentioned the long-standing, friendly and deep-rooted ties between both Russia and Palestine. On March 19, 2010 the Middle East Quartet which was composed of the European Union, Russia, the United States, and the United Nations called for a resumption of peace talks between both Israel and the Palestinians. The Quartet also called for Israel to freeze settlement construction and resume peace talks with the Palestinians. After the Gaza flotilla raid on May 31, 2010, Russian President Dmitry Medvedev called for a thorough investigation of the incident and said that, in any case, the deaths of people are irreversible. Prime Minister Vladimir Putin condemned the assault and expressed concern that it was conducted in international waters. On June 8, Putin condemned the acts and called for it to be investigated specially, particularly because it occurred in international waters. In a rare display of unity, the Foreign Ministries of Russia and the EU adopted a joint statement concerning the flotilla attack, which correlates with the UN Security Council activity in the situation. Russia's Foreign Ministry further expressed "condemnation and profound concern" over the incident and called for a full investigation. It stated that the "use of arms against civilians and the detention of the vessels on the high seas without any legal grounds constitute a gross violation of generally accepted international legal norms." The head of the Russian State Duma Foreign Affairs Committee, Konstantin Kosachev, called for an "urgent meeting" of the Middle East Quartet to discuss the incident. On April 28, 2011 after the rival Palestinian factions Fatah and Hamas signed a deal (ultimately unfulfilled) to form a national unity government ahead of the national elections, the Russian Foreign Ministry spokesman Alexei Sazonov said that Russia was pleased with the fact that the Palestinians were able to reach an accord and that Russia hoped that with the implementation of the accord there will be hope for peace in the Middle East. He also said that Russia always supports the national aspirations of the Palestinian people.

On November 27, 2011, Russian President Medvedev sent Palestinian President Abbas an official letter of support for Palestinian statehood.

During the November 2012 Operation Pillar of Defense in the Gaza Strip, the Russian Foreign Minister Sergei Lavrov called for end to the violence after a meeting held with Gulf Arab foreign ministers in Riyadh. Foreign Ministry spokesman Alexander Lukashevich said: "The attacks on southern Israel, as well as Israel's disproportionate shelling, are entirely unacceptable. We urge all sides to end the military confrontation immediately and to prevent a new round of bloodshed in the Gaza Strip." Following a telephone conversation between President Putin and Netanyahu, the presidential press service said that "The President of Russia called on the parties to exercise restraint and avoid the path of escalating violence, whose victims include civilians, and to do everything to return the situation to its normal course". On November 29, 2012, Russia voted in favor of UN General Assembly Resolution 67/19 on upgrading Palestine to non-member observer state status in the United Nations. During the 2014 Israel–Gaza conflict, Russian President Vladimir Putin telephoned Israeli Prime Minister Benjamin Netanyahu urging him to stop the operation in Gaza that “lead to multiple deaths among civilians." It added that "the conversation was requested by the Israeli side." In a telephone conversation with Israeli Prime Minister Benjamin Netanyahu on July 23, Russian President Vladimir Putin said further fighting in Gaza will lead to a dramatic deterioration of the humanitarian situation and to more casualties and suffering among the civilian population. Putin stressed that "there is no alternative to ceasefire and a political settlement" and reiterated his readiness to "facilitate mediatory efforts and the implementation of peace initiatives, including within the UN framework". Chairman of the Foreign Affairs Committee of the Federation Council, in the upper house of the Russian Parliament, Mikhail Margelov, said Russia is ready to facilitate reconciliation between Palestine and Israel. He also said that "It is very important for us that the parties complied with the UN resolutions. Our position remained unchanged: we want the Jewish and Arab peoples to live in peace and accord. We’re ready to facilitate the peace process at the bilateral level and within international organizations. Amid the ground operation in Gaza the logic of events prevails over political expediency. In Gaza there are different groups that do not maintain contacts. The situation is not controlled by a single centre. This complicates attempts to find a political solution". On July 25 the Russian Foreign Ministry published a message calling for an immediate ceasefire in Gaza under Egypt's initiative saying "The events in Gaza arouse growing concern. We condemn the death of innocent people, primarily children, during the attack on the UN school in Beit-Hanoun".

In October 2022, during a meeting with Putin in Kazakhstan, Abbas dismissed US role in the Israeli-Palestinian conflict and expressed his desire for Russia to play a more central role as mediator, provoking criticism by Washington.

See also

Foreign relations of Russia
Foreign relations of Palestine
Russia and the Iran–Israel proxy conflict

References

External links

  Documents on the Palestine–Russia relationship at the Russian Ministry of Foreign Affairs

Diplomatic missions
  Embassy of the State of Palestine in Moscow

 
Russia
Bilateral relations of Russia